Ixodorhynchidae is a small family of mites in the order Mesostigmata.

Species
Ixodorhynchidae contains eight genera, with twelve recognized species:

 Genus Asiatolaelaps Fain, 1961
 Asiatolaelaps evansi Fain, 1965
 Genus Chironobius H. A. P. M. Lombert & W. W. Moss, 1983
 Chironobius alvus H. A. P. M. Lombert & W. W. Moss, 1983
 Chironobius nordestinus Lizaso, 1983
 Genus Ixobioides Fonseca, 1934
 Ixobioides brachispinosus (Lizaso, 1983)
 Ixobioides butantanensis Fonseca, 1934
 Genus Ixodorhynchoides Johnston, 1962
 Ixodorhynchoides truncatus Johnston, 1962
 Genus Ixodorhynchus Ewing, 1922
 Ixodorhynchus liponyssoides Ewing, 1922
 Ixodorhynchus piger (Berlese, 1917)
 Genus Ophiogongylus H. A. P. M. Lombert & W. W. Moss, 1983
 Ophiogongylus breviscutum Lizaso, 1983
 Ophiogongylus rotundus H. A. P. M. Lombert & W. W. Moss, 1983
 Genus Scutanolaelaps Lavoipierre, 1959
 Scutanolaelaps ophidius Lavopierre, 1959
 Genus Strandtibbettsia Fain, 1961
 Strandtibbettsia gordoni (Tibbetts, 1957)

References

Mesostigmata
Acari families